Wellington Dantas de Jesus (born 9 June 1982) is a Brazilian former professional footballer who played as a midfielder.

Career
Born in Itabuna, Wellington started his career at Atlético Mineiro. He signed a five-year contract in June 2001. He moved to Aalborg Boldspilklub in summer 2004. He then returned to Brazil for Estrela do Norte. In summer 2007, he left for Sannois Saint-Gratien in Championnat National.

References

1982 births
Living people
Sportspeople from Bahia
Association football midfielders
Brazilian footballers
Clube Atlético Mineiro players
AaB Fodbold players
Estrela do Norte Futebol Clube players
Entente SSG players
Red Star F.C. players
Al-Sailiya SC players
Yverdon-Sport FC players
US Lusitanos Saint-Maur players
AC Boulogne-Billancourt players
Danish Superliga players
Championnat National players
Championnat National 2 players
Brazilian expatriate footballers
Expatriate men's footballers in Denmark
Brazilian expatriate sportspeople in Denmark
Expatriate footballers in France
Brazilian expatriate sportspeople in France
Expatriate footballers in Switzerland
Brazilian expatriate sportspeople in Switzerland